The Mercedes-Benz W126 is the company's internal designation for its second generation S-Class, manufactured in sedan/saloon (1979–1991) and coupé (1981–1990) models, succeeding the company's W116 range. Mercedes introduced the 2-door C126 coupé model, marketed as the SEC, in September 1981. This generation was the first S-Class to have separate chassis codes for standard and long wheelbases (W126 and V126) and for coupé (C126).

The long 12-year production (1979–1991) resulted in 818,063 sedans/saloons and 74,060 coupés being built, totalling 892,123. W126 is so far the most successful and the longest in production for S-Class.

History 
After the debut of W116 S-Class in 1972, Mercedes-Benz began preparing for the next generation S-Class in October 1973. The project, code-named "Project W126", aimed to provide an improved ride, better handling, and improved fuel efficiency. The oil crisis of 1973 and increasingly stringent emission and safety regulations in the United States had an important influence in developing the W126 for reduced emission and increased fuel efficiency.

The W126 design team, led by Mercedes-Benz's chief designer Bruno Sacco, aimed to design a more aerodynamic shape and retain the unmistakable S-Class design elements. The aerodynamic drag was reduced through lengthy wind tunnel testing and reshaping of front end and bumper along with hiding the wipers underneath the hood/bonnet for smoother flow. Reducing the weight was accomplished by extensive use of high-strength low-alloy (HSLA) sheet and polyurethane deformable material for bumpers and side claddings. The lighter alloy material was used for the heavily revised M116/M117 V8 engines for the reduced weight. Both had contributed to the reduction of fuel consumption by 10% as compared to its predecessor.

After six years of development, the W126 was introduced at the IAA Frankfurt in September 1979. At the introduction, S-Class was available in two wheelbase lengths (standard and long) and three petrol engine options with one six-cylinder inline engine and two V8 engines. The diesel engine option was introduced in September 1981 exclusively for the North American market.

At the 1981 IAA Frankfurt, a coupé version of S-Class, C126, was introduced with 380 SEC and 500 SEC. It was the first time that a coupé version was derived from S-Class chassis. At the same time, the "Energiekonzept" (Energy Concept) was introduced to improve the fuel efficiency of S-Class through engine revisions.

The W126 was revised in 1985 for 1986 model year. The revised "Second Series" model range was introduced at 1985 IAA Frankfurt with new six-cylinder petrol and diesel engines and the V8 petrol engines enlarged to 4.2 and 5.5 litres. The 5-litre V8 was carried over. The visual changes included the smoother bumpers and side claddings, revised "Gullydeckelfelge" (German for manhole-cover wheel rim) alloy wheels, and deeper front bumper with integrated air dam.

The W126 generation was replaced by the W140 in 1991.

Styling 

From 1973 to 1975, Mercedes-Benz designers worked on the successor to the W116. After several design concept were presented, the final design for W126 was approved and frozen in 1976. The design work for coupé began immediately after the approval and was finalised in 1977. Design patents were first filed on 3 March 1977 and later on 6 September 1977 at the United States Patent Office.

Compared to its predecessor, the W116, the W126 featured improved aerodynamics with a drag coefficient of Cd 0.36 for the sedan/saloon and 0.34 for the coupés.

Models 

The pre-facelift model range (1979–1985 for sedan/saloon and 1982–1985 for coupé) included the 280 S/SE/SEL, 300 SD (North American market only), 380 SE/SEL/SEC, and 500 SE/SEL/SEC. The revised second series (1986–1991) with petrol engines included 260 SE, 300 SE/SEL, 420 SE/SEL/SEC, 500 SE/SEL/SEC, and 560 SE/SEL/SEC. The diesel-engined facelift version for the North American market only included the 300 SDL (the first diesel S-Class with long wheelbase) and then the 350 SD/SDL (the first diesel S-Class to be available in both wheelbase lengths).

Safety 

 Use of high-strength low-alloy (HSLA) sheet in its construction to reduce the weight without compromising the structural strength and integrity.
 Anti-lock braking system (ABS) (first appeared in its predecessor, the W116) was standard on 500 SEL and 500 SEC and optional for the rest of model range until 1985. The ABS eventually became standard for the entire model range during the second series (1986-1991).
 Seat Belt Pretensioners enabled all seat belts (with exception of rear centre shoulder belt on sedan/saloon) to tighten when the car sensed conditions that could lead to an accident such as sudden, forceful braking or sudden deceleration during the collision.
 Crumple zones front and rear which absorbed impact energies, reducing passenger injury.
 Fluted taillamps, the design pioneered on the R107/C107, was carried over. The fluted design maintains the visibility of taillamps when the dirt accumulates on the outer edges.
 Driver's airbags were introduced in 1981 as an extra-cost option for all models and engines. From September 1987 on, the passenger's airbags were added as extra-cost option for the 1988 model year. The consumers could choose either driver's airbag only or driver's and passenger's airbags. For the US market, the driver's airbags were standard from 1987 onward due to the federal regulations; the passenger's airbags were extra cost option until 1989 when they became standard for models with V8 engines only and 1991 for the rest of model range.
 Traction control system (TCS), also known as Acceleration Slip Regulation (ASR), to prevent wheelspin (a Mercedes-Benz first). This feature was available on European models only from 1989 and 1991 and on North American models (560 SEL and 560 SEC) for 1991 only.
 A third brake lamp in the centre of rear windscreen was federally mandated in the United States from 1986 model year on. In some markets, it was offered as standard or extra-cost option.

Comfort and convenience 

 Courtesy lights on the underside of the doors, to enable the occupant to see the ground when exiting the vehicle at night.
 Rear reading lamps were fitted to the C-pillar enabling rear passengers to read or work at night without distracting the driver. Extra cost options for the rear seat passengers were: individually adjusted seat heaters (never offered in coupé models during its entire production run); bench seat that can move forward and back electrically by 10 cm (long wheelbase models only); foot rests; from 1987 on, rear windscreen window shades that are electrically raised and lowered by switch on centre console; and the back of front seats are contoured as to give more legroom. 
 From 1979 to 1984, the driver and front passenger seat heaters were separate extra-cost options. From 1985 to 1991, both driver and front passenger seat heaters were offered as a single extra-cost option.
 Beginning with 1985 model year, the rear individual seats and centre console as appeared in coupé model could be fitted to the long wheelbase models if the owner desires, giving the car a 2+2 seating format. The individual seat is electrically adjustable by moving forward and back only.
 An optional fully automatic climate control system that used an interior temperature sensor to more accurately climatise the cabin. This sensor was mounted overhead (near the sunroof switch) so that when the roof was open, the sensor would detect cool air-flow and call upon the system to adjust heat flow accordingly.
 Exterior temperature sensor with LCD display set in main instrument console below the speedometer to inform the driver of exterior conditions. This was delineated in Fahrenheit for US-market cars and in Celsius for the rest of the world.
 Due to the B-pillar moving further back in the coupé models with longer doors, Mercedes-Benz developed the world's first seat belt presenters. When the doors are closed and the motor started, the presenters extend the shoulder anchor points forward to the driver and front passenger by about 30 cm. This facilitates easier reach and grab of seat belts. Once the seat belts are anchored or after 30 seconds, the presenters descended back into the B-pillar.
 W126 premiered the power seat control, a first for Mercedes-Benz. Instead of placing the toggle or button switches with same shapes in the hard to reach or see areas, Mercedes-Benz developed the haptic switches in shape of a seat: one switch resembling the seat back for adjusting the seat back; another switch resembling the seat for moving the seat forward and back as well as raising and lowering. The two memory function buttons allow the front occupants to set and select their preferred positions accordingly. After the 17-year patent expired, this design was widely copied by other manufacturers in the late 1990s. Another first for Mercedes-Benz is an electrically adjustable steering column that extends and contracts by toggle switch underneath the steering column. The steering column position can be stored in the driver's side memory function along with the preferred seat position.
 W126 was first from Mercedes-Benz to have the theft deterrent system as option installed at the factory. EDW (Einbruch-Diebstahl-Warnanlage, break-in theft alarm system) can emit the alarm sound and immobilise several components (radio, brakes, ignition lock, and a few others) if the car was being towed away or if any of hood/bonnet, trunk/boot, doors were forcibly opened. From 1984 on for the models with central locking system, the owner can turn the front door lock further to bolt the doors as to make them very difficult to be forcibly opened. The owner can order the separate bolt system for the trunk/bolt, making it equally difficult to pry the trunk/boot open. They require a special key with red dot.

Drivetrain technologies 
The four-speed automatic transmission had a new topographical sensor that improved the drivability by monitoring the vehicle's position (flat surface, incline, or decline) and the position of throttle pedal. This prevents the unintended acceleration when coasting downhill without the frequent braking to maintain the speed. The Second Series has a "hill-hold" feature that prevents the vehicle from rolling back suddenly when disengaging the brake and engaging the throttle pedals at the steep incline. The transmission in European models has a S/W switch to allow the start in either first (Standard) or second (Winter) gear respectively. The "Second Series" changed the S/W to S/E for Economy. The topographical sensor also offers a better driving experience with cruise control by adjusting the throttle smoothly and automatically without sudden lurching or decelerating when maintaining the desired speed. 

The W126 carried forward the self-leveling hydropneumatic suspension of the W116 450 SEL 6.9 model. Like the W116 and W123, the rear-wheel hydropneumatic suspension system was offered in W126 as an option. The updated version was called HPF II (short for Hydropneumatische Federung) was available from 1981 to 1985 (on the 380 SEL and 500 SEL) and very briefly on the 500 SE in 1985. The self-leveling technology responds to changes in weight distribution (passengers, luggage, fuel...) and was therefore less applicable in shorter wheelbase models.

For the "Second Series" (1986-1991), the hydropneumatic suspension was heavily redesigned and named HPF III. The HPF III automatically lowers the chassis by 24 mm when the vehicle is travelled at least 120 km/h for improved aerodynamic flow and better high speed stability. The system adjusts the damping rate from soft to hard based on speed and road condition for extra comfort and better drivability. Additionally, the driver can select to raise the car by 35 mm if travelling over coarse-surfaced road (only up to 80 km/h). From 1986 to 1990, the HPF III option was available in 420 SEL, 500 SEL, 560 SE, and 560 SEL. For the final year of production, HPF III was available in longer wheelbase only (420 SEL, 500 SEL, and 560 SEL). Due to its complexity and tendency to fail catastrophically, HPF III was very difficult to service and was often, at the owner's request, removed and replaced with coil springs and shock absorbers from models without hydropneumatic suspension system.

At the 1983 IAA, Mercedes-Benz introduced Reiserechner ("Trip calculator"), its first trip computer option, in W126 for the 1984 model year. The trip computer has a rectangular control panel on the centre console between the power window switches and the round information panel in the instrument clusters. A panel occupies the gauge cluster formerly used by tachometer, which moved to the left gauge cluster, sharing with oil, fuel, and temperature gauges. The information panel contains a large horizontal LCD display in the middle. Each of four sections has three arrows, illuminating the driver's selection. The upper left section is ZEIT (time); the upper right, WEG (route); lower left, GESCHW. (GESCHWINDIGKEIT, speed); lower right, VEBR. (VERBRAUCH, fuel consumption). The control panel has a large raised cross in the middle, dividing the panel into four corresponding sections of two buttons each in a four-by-two grid. The haptic touch allows the driver to feel his way around the control buttons without taking his eyes off the road: a typical Mercedes-Benz safety consideration. The four buttons in the middle allow the driver to select ZEIT, WEG, GESCHW., or VEBR.: the selection of their subfunctions is cycled through by pressing the button a few times. Two buttons on left side are for selecting short distance (K = KURZSTRECKENBETRIEB) and activation for inputting the number (P = PROGRAMMIERTASTE). Two buttons on right side are for selecting long distance (L = LANGSTRECKENBETRIEB) and deactivation of inputting the number (E = EINGABEABSCHLUẞTASTE). The top row of buttons (K, upper-left section, upper-right section, and L) has input of 1000, 100, 10, and 1, which are activated by pressing P and deactivated by E. The option was dropped in W126 a few years later due to its complexity of configuring the trip computer, requiring an accompanying 18-page instruction handbook to understand its operation, and due to the frequent failure of its control panel buttons.

Engines 

First Series (1979-1985)

At the introduction in September 1979, the 2.8-litre DOHC six-cylinder inline M110 engine for 280 S/SE/SEL was carried over from W116. The revised M116/M117 V8 engines had a significant innovation: aluminium block without iron sleeves as found in the competitors’ engines. Mercedes-Benz developed a special silicon coating as to harden the cylinder liners against excessive wear and tear. The V8 engines were offered in two sizes: 3.8 litres (M116) and 5 litres (M117). The M116 V8 engine had a single timing chain while the M117 V8 engine had double timing chains. The frequent mechanical failure of single timing chain in M116 V8 engine was addressed in 1982 by switching to double timing chains from M117 V8 engine.

The smaller of the two V8 engines was initially the only one offered in the US market, to help meet Corporate Average Fuel Economy (CAFE) requirements. The 380 SEL earned a poor customer perception in the United States as being severely underpowered and due to mechanical issues with the single timing chain. The severe performance shortcoming of W126 with V8 engine was addressed by introducing more powerful 500 SEL/SEC in 1984.

The S-Class coupé was fitted with V8 engines only for the first time.

The 3.0-litre five-cylinder inline OM617 diesel engine was carried over from W116 with same performance. The diesel engines were again never offered in the markets outside United States and Canada.

This discrepancy wasn't addressed until 1994 when W140 S 350 Turbodiesel was introduced in Europe for the first time.

In 1981, Mercedes-Benz introduced the Energiekonzepts ("Energy Concept") programme in reducing the fuel consumption. This programme revised the combustion chambers and piston heads with lower compression ratio in the V8 engines. This revision caused further drop in engine performance.

Second Series (1986-1991)

For the second series introduced in September 1985, the engine range was extensively revised with new six-cylinder inline engines and enlarged V8 engines. Only 5.0-litre M117 V8 was carried over from the first series, expanding the V8 engine range to three.

The revised engine range focused more on reducing pollution and fuel consumption even further. For the first time, the customers outside US and Canadian markets could choose the models with or without catalysators. The models without catalysators can be retrofitted with catalysators at later date if the customers choose to: this retrofit method is called RÜF (Rückrüstfahrzeug — loosely translated as retrofit vehicle). The RÜF models had a mechanical switch in the engine bay to be operated by owners for running on lead or lead-free fuels, a necessary feature for driving outside Germany or in areas within Germany where the lead-free fuel wasn't widespread yet. In 1990, all engines were fitted with catalysators only and the mechanical switch eliminated.

The new six-cylinder inline M103 engine had a single overhead camshaft and electronic-mechanical fuel injection and was available in two sizes: 2.6 and 3.0 litres. The carburetted engine fitted to 280 S was eliminated, marking the end of carburetted engines for S-Class, and replaced with fuel-injected engines for 260 and 300.

The V8 engines were again bored out to 4.2 litres from 3.8 litres for 420 (M116) and 5.5 litres from 5.0 litres for 560 (M117) while 5.0-litre V8 for 500 (M117) was carried over. The V8 engines were fitted with new electronic ignition system and Bosch KE-Jetronic electronic-mechanical fuel injection system, first appeared in W201 190E. The revised V8 engines except 5.0-litre version had slight performance increase.

The most powerful engine ever fitted to W126 S-Class was 5.5-litre V8, putting out 221 kW (300 PS, 296 bhp). This engine, classified as ECE-Variante (German name), has higher compression ratio of 10:5 and cannot be retrofitted with catalysator at later date. In September 1986, the ECE-Variante was superseded by RÜF-Variante, which retains the same horsepower figure without catalysator and lower figure if retrofitted with catalysator at later date.

For the US and Canadian markets, a new 3.0-litre six-cylinder inline OM603 diesel engine was introduced, replacing five-cylinder engine with same displacement. It was a first six-cylinder passenger diesel engine by Mercedes-Benz. This new engine was available in long wheelbase version only, 300 SDL, for the first time. For California, the diesel engines were fitted with diesel particulate filter, a world's first for the passenger car. The new engine had an ill-gotten reputation for higher percentage of aluminium cylinder head failure due to poor placement of diesel particulate filter and due to the erosion of head gasket, allowing cooling fluid to seep in the cylinders. However, they failed to perform as designed and were removed from the engines. For 1988, the engine was revised to correct the issues and move the particulate filter further away from the engine. In 1990, the same engine was bored out to 3.5 litres as to compensate for reduced performance due to stricter emission regulations. The bored out 3.5-litre version did not have any of aforementioned issues other than some units experiencing the unexplained erosion of head gasket. The 3.5-litre version was available in both standard and long wheelbases (350 SD and 350 SDL).

Transmissions

First Series (1979–1985)

The automatic transmission had four speeds with direct drive in the fourth gear for the entire run from 1979 to 1991. The 280 S/SE/SEL had 4-speed manual transmission as standard with 5-speed manual and 4-speed automatic transmissions as extra-cost options.

The manual transmission was not fitted to the V8 engines during the first series.

U.S. models, including the 300 SD Turbodiesel, had automatic transmission as sole transmission choice.

Second Series (1985-1991)

From 1986 onward, the automatic transmission was revised to include the option of selecting S (Standard) and E (Economy) shifting points. The models, 260 SE, 300 SE, and 300 SEL were fitted with standard 5-speed manual and optional extra-cost 4-speed automatic transmissions. For one year from September 1986 to June 1987, extra cost automatic transmission option wasn't offered for 260 SE and 300 SE. The customers ordering 420 SE could choose either 5-speed manual or 4-speed automatic transmission.

U.S. models had automatic transmission as sole transmission choice.

U.S. Grey Market 

When the W126 was introduced in the United States in September 1980, Mercedes-Benz offered the smaller 3.8-litre V8 engine only as to avoid the gas guzzler penalty under Corporate Average Fuel Economy (CAFE) regulations.

As the fear of oil crisis waned in 1982, the American consumers demanded the more powerful S-Class models, and grey importers brought the S-Class with 5-litre V8 engines to the United States and modified them to meet US FMVSS and EPA regulations. The smaller-engined 280 S-Class was also imported, offering significant savings over the V8 models. The W126 was a major part of this parallel market, with 22,000 imported in a segment that hit 66,900 cars in 1985, the biggest year for grey imports.

Consequently, Mercedes-Benz added 500 SEL/500 SEC to the American model range for 1984 model year as to countereffect the grey imports while 3.8-litre V8 engine remained in 380 SE (standard wheelbase only) and 380 SL.

In 1988, an intense lobbying effort by Mercedes-Benz and other foreign manufacturers led U.S. Congress to eliminate this consumer option and revise the rules for registered importers.

Special variants 

 Although it hadn't yet merged with Mercedes-Benz, "pre-merger" AMG offered body kits for all W126 models, as well as a "wide body" kit for the coupé. The "wide body" cars were fitted with distinctive AMG-designed front and rear fenders and door panels that allowed much wider wheels and tires to be fitted. AMG also offered engine modifications with displacements of 5.0, 5.6, and 6.0-liters. The most famous and rarest was the DOHC 6.0-liter engine, based on the original 117.968 engine. Some of options offered were Gleason Torsen differential in various ratios, manual transmission (extremely rare), and various TV/radio consoles.
 Trasco Bremen offered a stretch limousine version called the "1000 SEL".
 A variety of coachbuilders offered convertibles based on the SEC (coupé) model. Caruna of Switzerland also offered a full four-door convertible based on the SEL (but using the SE's shorter rear doors). One of these (a blue one) still belongs to Dutch Royal Family, who use it at their resort in Porto Ercole, Italy.
A coachbuilder, Caro International, built an estate/station wagon version of W126 S-Class called 560 TEL.
 S-Guard, specially modified W126 S-Class models were produced for the transport of dignitaries and world leaders. Among the modifications made included a wheelbase stretch, bulletproof glass, and armored body panels.

Racing 
Two AMG-modified 500 SEC cars raced at the 1989 24 Hours of Spa. Both cars failed to finish, with one suffering gearbox issues, while the other had issues with the rear axle.

Awards 
 The 300 SD received the 1981 Motor Trend Import Car of the Year.
 The 380 SE was the Wheels Magazine Car of the Year in 1981.
 The W126 was awarded the U.S. Highway Loss Data Institute "Safest Passenger Car of the Year" in 1988 and 1989.
 The W126 was the third-ranked luxury vehicle in J.D. Power's 1990 Initial Quality Survey (IQS).
 From 1987 to 1990, Mercedes received the highest customer ratings in the J.D. Power Sales Satisfaction Index.

Legacy 
The W126 series was the highest volume S-Class on record in terms of production. Three armoured 560 SEL ordered by Saddam Hussein had a series of pipes shooting flames out of the sides.

A limited number of W126 continued to be produced in South Africa until 1993(?), two years after the introduction of W140 S-Class. No figures were given for South African production. Nelson Mandela was given a commemorative model, a red 1990 500 SE.

Technical data

Dimensions and weight

Timeline

References

Notes

Bibliography

General

Workshop manuals

External links 

 The unofficial W126 page – history and details of the W126
 Fuenfkommasechs.de – German website with vast information on development, model history, engines and innovations
 Production information, technical data, and media of the Mercedes-Benz Classic Digital Archive

W126
Cars introduced in 1979
1980s cars
1990s cars
Full-size vehicles
Grand tourers
Rear-wheel-drive vehicles
Sedans
Limousines
W126
Cars discontinued in 1991